Todd Woodbridge and Mark Woodforde were the defending champions but only Woodbridge competed that year with Jonas Björkman.

Björkman and Woodbridge won in the final 7–6(7–2), 3–6, 6–3 against Daniel Nestor and Sandon Stolle.

Seeds
Champion seeds are indicated in bold text while text in italics indicates the round in which those seeds were eliminated.

Draw

Final

Top half

Bottom half

External links
 2001 Hamburg Masters Doubles Draw

2001 ATP Tour